Robinsonia praphoea is a moth in the family Erebidae. It was described by Paul Dognin in 1906. It is found in French Guiana, Amazonas, Venezuela and Peru.

References

Moths described in 1906
Robinsonia (moth)